Jacques van der Klundert (born 15 April 1938) is a retired Dutch professional road racing cyclist. He won one stage of the Olympia's Tour in 1960 and rode the Tour de France in 1964.

References

1938 births
Living people
Dutch male cyclists
People from Steenbergen
Cyclists from North Brabant
20th-century Dutch people